West Melbourne may refer to:

West Melbourne, Florida, United States
West Melbourne, Victoria, Australia